Vest-Telemark Airport, Fyresdal is an airport in Fyresdal municipality in Vestfold og Telemark, Norway. It does not service commercial aircraft. Was until 2008 operated by Airparc Fyresdal and in a joint venture with a local hotel. From 2009 operated by the local aeroclub and Fyresdal kommune.

History

The initiative to establish an airport at Fyresdal was taken by Snorre Kjetilson and Snorre Hansen. The latter who worked for the municipality, while the former was the proprietor of Fjellfly, an airline based at Skien Airport, Geiteryggen. They saw the airport as an opportunity to attract tourism to the district and particularly aimed at English and German tourists.

The airport was opened on 23 September 1967. The following day it featured an air show with 6,000 spectators. After initial services by Fjellfly and a few flights by Cimber Air, a separate airline was started at the airport, which operated during part of the 1970s. Fyresdal Air Taxi was established by Oddvar Faane and received a Piper Cherokee. This aircraft was only operated from March through September 1973. Later the airline also bought a Cessna 180 and a Piper Aztec. There was little business out of Fyresdal and the aircraft were mostly used elsewhere.

References

Bibliography

 
 

Airports in Vestfold og Telemark
Fyresdal
1967 establishments in Norway
Airports established in 1967